Niau Airport  is an airport on Niau atoll in French Polynesia. The airport received 2300 passengers in 2021.

The construction of the airport resulted in significant disruption to the habitat of the endangered Niau kingfisher.

Airlines and destinations

Passenger

Statistics

See also
 List of airports in French Polynesia

References

Airports in French Polynesia